Escape from Scorpion Island is a BAFTA-nominated BBC children's TV adventure game show in which contestants compete to "escape from an exotic island". Series 4 was produced by Foundation/Freehand for CBBC and the Australian Broadcasting Corporation.

Series 4 was filmed in the Tallebudgera Valley in Queensland, Australia. It first aired on CBBC on 9 August 2010 on Mondays to Thursdays, and BBC 2 on the weekends in the U.K., and in Australia it first aired on 13 October 2010 to 19 November 2010 and ran from Monday to Friday on ABC3. Myleene Klass and Johny Pitts replaced JK and Joel as hosts for this series.

Synopsis
Legend has it, centuries ago on Scorpion Island, five adventurers with special skills tried to take on the island; those skills being Bravery, Speed, Strength, Balance and Stamina. The island, furious at this, mischievously turned them all into stone scorpions. 10 adventurers have come to the island, with two people representing each power, and are split into two teams: Sting and Claw. The teams must battle each other in challenges to win Sands of Times' and Totem Power Pieces for the final challenge. Their mission, to escape from the island, with the losers taking the place of the five original adventures in the stone as punishment.

Contestants
There were 10 adventurers on the island; 6 from the UK, and 4 from Australia. The Australian adventurers are Angus, Harriet, Janardan and Maddy.

Team Claw (Yellow) (Creek Camp) Orange Helmets; 3 Sands of Time; 7 Totem Pieces

Brandon Barns, 12 - (Representing Balance)
Abubakar "Abbey" Garba, 11 - (Representing Bravery)
Bronte McKeown, 12 - (Representing Speed) (Original member of Team Sting, swapped with Shya on Day 6)
Rachael Davidson, 12- (Representing Stamina)
Harriet O'Connor, 11 - (Representing Strength)

Team Sting (Red) (Tree Camp) Black Helmets; 8 Sands of Time; 3 Totem Pieces

Janardan Berne, 13 - (Representing Balance)
Madeline "Maddy" Hunt, 13 - (Representing Bravery)
Shya Pinnock, 11 - (Representing Speed) (Original member of Team Claw, swapped with Bronte on Day 6)
Angus McAdam, 11 - (Representing Stamina)
Michael Tarpey, 12 - (Representing Strength)

Gaming elements
Island Challenge - For the first week, the two power captains competed in the first round. Whoever won earned their team an advantage for the second round. For the second week, team members played in the first round and earned their captains an advantage for the second round. The winner of the Island Challenge wins their team a bag of Sands of Time.
Totem Trial - These challenges take place in the Arena of the Powers. These involve tasks such as holding up heavy objects or guiding other team members through something. The winning team of each Totem Trial receives a Totem Power Piece.
Island Fire - The Island Fire selects the power captains for the next day and reveals the name of the next Island Challenge.

List of challenges

Note: All episodes are based the 30-minute version, all days refer to the 60-minute version.

Day 1 (Episodes 1 and 2)
Arrival - The 10 adventurers arrive on scorpion island, 9 of them skydive while the 10th, Brandon, arrives by helicopter.  Due to limited landing space the adventurers were split into 2 groups and landed in the following order: Maddy, Abbey, Janardan, Shya and then Rachael in the first group.  The second group in landing order was: Angus, Harriet, Brontë and Michael.  Brandon then arrived in a helicopter and joined the other adventurers.
Battle for the Powers - As soon as the adventurers arrived Abbey and Maddy received bravery as they chose the 2 purple stones out of a bag.  They were therefore each given a coloured scorpion necklace to show their power.  The remaining adventurers then competed in the battle for the powers to see which two adventurers will win the power of speed (Shya and Brontë), strength (Harriet and Michael) and balance (Brandon and Janardan) until only 2 adventurers remain without powers (Angus and Rachael).  They also saw their campsites and were introduced to the island fire.
Island Fire - The adventurers who have earned their powers were split into 2 groups.  Each group has one of each power in it.  All the adventurers who won the challenge where they gained their powers were placed in one group and those who came second in the other.  The fate of Angus and Rachael was left as a cliffhanger and was revealed in the next episode.

Day 2 (Episodes 3 and 4)
Reckless Ravine - In the first round, the players must walk across a cable hanging above the forest using holders and platforms for some support to the middle platform. The players must then untie one of their dices hanging underneath the middle platform singularly and throw them off into a net below. If the player gets a die in the net nearest to them, they get 1 point, in the net further than them for 3 points, or for the furthest net, 5 points. The player who gets the more points once all of the dice have been used wins. In the second round, the players have to transport six heavy die from one side of the cable to the other in the fastest time possible.
First Round - Angus from Sting vs Rachael from Claw - Stamina
Reward - A 10-second time advantage for the second round
Second Round - Janardan and Maddy from Sting vs Abbey and Shya from Claw
Totem Trial - The Scarecrow - Two players have to hold two heavy rings on each side of their body hanging out like a scarecrow. If one player lowers their arms down too far, the other one wins a point. The winner is best of three points.

In the Arena of the Powers, Angus and Rachael were rewarded the power of stamina for competing in all of the Battle for the Powers challenges. They were also made the first Power Captains for their teams. They then had to draw a coloured stone from a bag to find out what teams they would be captaining.  Angus got the red stone, making him in Sting, and Rachael got the yellow stone, making her in Claw.  The Dial of Destiny was then spun to find out who would get the choice of groups for their team. The spinner landed on red, Sting's colour, so Angus chose the group with Bronte, Maddy, Michael and Janardan.

In the first round of the Island Challenge, Rachael made her way first to the middle of the cable and threw her first die, which missed the net. Angus then went to get his first die and scored one point at instant. Rachael then got a die in the 3-point net, and got 3 more die after that. Angus had trouble trying to get more of his dice in the nets, and even dropped one by mistake when he was reaching for another. Rachael and Angus then tried moving towards the five-point nets. Rachael scored a die in a five-point net, but Angus missed it on his last two attempts. Rachael won 17-1 easily and got the time advantage for Claw.

In the Totem Trial, Angus picked Bronte and Michael and Rachael picked Shya and Harriet. The first round was against the two power captains, Angus and Rachael. During the challenge, Sting and Claw tried to distract each other while Angus and Rachael were holding the rings. The two held their rings for a minute and a half until Rachael dropped them, making it 1-0 for Sting. In the next round was Bronte vs Shya. Both of them looked each other in the eyes and stayed focused while they were holding their rings. Sting stood behind Bronte pretending to make Shya drop the rings, but soon, Shya lowered her arms a little bit too low and lost 2–0, which was enough for Sting to win. Because this was the first Totem Trial, the island had a twist for Sting. They had to choose whether they want to keep their Totem Power Piece, or have the choice of camps and sacrifice their piece to Claw. They decided to keep the power piece, so Claw had the choice of camps. They chose the creek camp, leaving Sting with tree camp.

In the second round of the Island Challenge, Sting went first. Janardan and Maddy took a risk and held three dice each to take to the other side. The two wobbled a little bit with their crossing and did not communicate because they knew what to do. Janardan got to the other side of the wire first, shortly followed by Maddy. In Claw's turn, Abbey took three dice across and made his way to the other side quickly, but Shya just stayed on the starting position, because she was slightly scared of heights and not confident. Abbey then went back and took two more dice across, and Shya took the last die, but she was very slow, so halfway across, Abbey offered to take the last die with the other two, and they both got to the other side. In the end, even with Claw's time advantage, Sting won the challenge by a huge time margin, and the first Sands of Time.

Day 3 (Episodes 5 and 6)
Edge of Doom - In the first round, one player must shoot 15 foam darts using a special falcon catapult on a floating platform in the water into a goal that is near the edge of the waterfall, while the other player defends the goal with a fishing net used to catch the darts. The player shooting gets one point if they get a dart in the net, and the defender gets two points if they catch a dart with the net. After one player has used up all their darts, they swap places. The player with the most points wins. In the second round, one team of four contestants use the falcon shooter with 25 foam darts, while a player from the other team is being pulled from the edge of the water by three other teammates. The team with the most points wins.
First Round - Janardan from Sting vs Brandon from Claw - Balance
Reward - To use the falcon catapult in the second round.
Second Round - Maddy, Bronte, Michael and Angus from Sting vs Abbey, Harriet, Shya and Rachael from Claw.
Totem Trial - Human Viaduct - The teams must transport coconuts using bamboo piping while standing on wood stumps to the other end. If a coconut is dropped, or a player falls off the stump, that coconut is out of play and the next coconut is in play. The team that transports the most coconuts in three minutes wins.

In the first round of the Island Challenge, Janardan was shooting first and Brandon was defending. After missing his first two shots, Janardon then got 4 points in a row after doing very high shots. He then had some trouble getting more shots, but Brandon managed to catch one arrow. With only a few yet, Janardan got another shot, and Brandon caught another arrow, bringing the score 6–4 to Janardan in the first part. After the two swapped places, Brandon had some problems with the shooter and got too many low shots, but was lucky to get one point after a dart just skimmed across the water, and then a high shot making the score tied. Janardan then caught another two shots, and Brandon scored another, but Brandon was still having some trouble with his last shots before the game was over. This made the score 10–7 to Janardan, therefore winning the round for Sting and the catapult for the next round.  Brandon then picked Abbey to be keeper in the second part of the island challenge.

In the Totem Trial, Claw got the choice of choosing whether to go first or second in the challenge after the Dial of Destiny landed on their team colour. Claw chose to go second as it enabled them to watch Sting, pick up any good tactics and make sure that they did not do the same mistakes. On Sting's turn, the team went really fast and were concentrating silently, only having one little mishap, but scoring 13 coconuts. On Claw's turn, the team went much faster than Sting, and Brandon even caught a coconut in mid-air, but then dropped it as he tried to put it in the holder. Although the team dropped two coconuts in total, and Brandon fell off his stump losing another, Claw scored 16 coconuts, and won the Totem Trial. Claw went back to camp and shouted from their camp out loud that they won, and then the team relaxed by having a humorous yoga lesson. Sting on the other hand, discussed what went wrong in the Totem Trial, and Janardan said that Sting was just unlucky.

In the second round of the Island Challenge, Sting had problems with trying to aim the catapult and had some bad shots, then once the team got a very high shot, Abbey caught it with his net getting two points for Claw. Janardan shouted to Sting when to aim, but either the team wasn't listening to him, or they couldn't do what he said. Sting were starting to improve their shots, and Abbey was very close to catching some of them, but neither could score points. After several more shots, Bronte managed to aim very high and scored a point for Sting. Abbey then got twisted being held up, and while Claw were trying to pulley him back into position again, Sting was lucky to score another point, bringing the score to 2-2. With only two arrows left, Sting missed another shot, and on their last, the dart just touched Abbey's net but missed, then it touched the water before moving into the goal. The shot did not count, making the round a draw, so both Sting and Claw received a Sands of Time each.

Day 4 (Episodes 7 and 8)
Danger Dunk - In the first round, one player must transport ten dice across the base of Skeleton Falls in under ten minutes using a net, while their opponent on a seat four metres high throws balls into another net on their back. If a ball lands in that net, they get a ten-second time penalty. Once the round is over the player swap roles. The player that does this faster wins. In the second round, one player from each team is hanging from a swing holding a large basket, while two other players have to throw balls into the basket. Every time a new batch of balls come from the waterfall, the players on the swings are raised higher. The team that gets the most balls into the basket wins.
First Round - Michael from Sting vs Harriet from Claw - Strength
Reward - The player on the seat in the second round starts the challenge lowered a metre.
Second Round - Maddy, Angus and Bronte from Sting vs Shya, Rachael, and Abbey from Claw.
Totem Trial - Pyramid Puzzle - The teams must transport four round pieces of a pyramid from one table to the other in size order, with the help of another table in the middle. A smaller piece of the pyramid can only go on top of a large piece. The team that does this the fastest wins.

In the first round of the Island challenge, Harriet was first to transport the dice while Michael was throwing. Harriet struggled with the first die while unhooking it and putting it in the bucket, and because she was staying still trying to do it, Michael was able to get some balls in her net. Fortunately when Harriet was getting a die in the bucket, she accidentally made the net bump her head, but one of the balls in her backpack fell out, so she lost one time penalty. As Harriet kept going, she got more exhausted. Michael even pulled a trick on her and called out to her that he saw an eel. Just as Harriet was trying to get her seventh die in, she ran out of time, scoring six dice, but a one-minute time penalty from Michael. When they swapped roles, Michael managed to transport his dice much faster, while Harriet was taking too long to aim balls into his net, and she kept missing. She also accidentally dropped two balls from her bag. Michael then found an easier way to get across by taking the edge of the course around. This kept continuing until Michael started having trouble putting his eighth die into the bucket. This made him an easy target for Harriet, who threw nine more balls at him, but kept missing. Michael, as he was getting another die, even made it fall into his net, but he got it out easily, while Harriet tried changing positions to throw the balls, but she still didn't score any.  Michael was able to transport all the dice within the time limit, getting no time limits from Harriet, therefore winning the challenge for Sting, earning an advantage. Afterwards, Harriet felt like she let her team down because she dropped some of her balls and the challenge was very hard.

In the Totem Trial, Sting went first. The team made the mistake of finishing their pyramid on the middle base, wasting valuable time. Sting then decided to stop and discuss what to do, but soon they managed to get the pyramid to the end base. On Claw's turn, the team ended up arguing a little, but, with the leading of Rachael and Shya they managed to get the pyramid to the end base quickly and simply. In the end, Claw was the fastest and won the Totem Trial and their second power piece. At Claw's camp, Rachael guessed that the power pieces were to be used for getting a head start climbing up something in the final challenge.

Before the second round of Danger Dunk, Harriet and Michael had to choose who was to compete in it. Claw decided that Harriet was to choose Shya, Rachael and Brandon, but when it came to officially nominating them, Harriet chose Abbey instead of Brandon because she felt that Abbey was more competitive. Abbey was rather surprised that he was chosen, and Brandon said that he was fine with the change.

In the second round of the Island Challenge, as Sting had their advantage, Bronte and Angus shovelled balls into Maddy's basket as quickly as possible. Both teams got a lot of shots in their baskets, but Maddy and Abbey had some trouble trying to hold their baskets up. Brandon shouted some advice to Claw, but the team didn't seem to be listening as they now started to miss when Abbey and Maddy were raised higher. Abbey even caught a ball with his hand by accident, but playing by the rules, he threw it away. As the rain started pouring down, trying to cope with the heavy basket, Maddy started dropping some of the balls, but quickly corrected herself. As they were raised higher, both teams could not get any more shots in, and then the time ran out. Sting won the challenge 90 balls to Claw's 73, and got their third Sands of Time.

After the challenges, Michael was proud of all Sting's members, but Harriet felt like she could've done a better job leading Claw, such as when she chose Abbey instead of Brandon for the second round of the Island Challenge.

Day 5 (Episodes 9 and 10)
Tracks of Terror - In the first round, a player is each on a trolley balanced on wires five storeys above the ground. They have to pull themselves to the other end of the wires to collect a bag of four balls. They then had to take them back to the side of the wires where they started within the scoring area and throw each ball into their hoop. For every ball a player scores gives one point to their team. They then have to repeat this with four more balls and then go to the finish line. The first player that reaches the finish line scores a bonus two points. The player that receives the most points wins. In the second round, the teams must go to the other end of the wires and collect team coloured water to carry in an open container hanging from the trolley. They then must go back to the start and empty the water into a bucket using a small metal cup. The team that collects the most water in 10 minutes wins.
First Round - Michael (filling in for Bronte) from Sting vs Shya from Claw - Speed
Reward - To be able to throw three cogs at the opposing team in the second round.
Second Round - Maddy and Janardan from Sting vs Harriet and Abbey from Claw.
Totem Trial - In the Dark - The team captains have to direct their team, tied together, blindfolded and carrying a block, through a course with poles that have statuettes on top. They then have to put the block on the table at the end of the course to finish. For every statue knocked off a pole, 10 seconds are added to the team's final time. The team captains directing have to use a series of instruments that have sounds for forward, backward, left, right and stop. The team that goes through the course quickest wins.

Before the first round of the Island Challenge, Bronte had an arm injury and was unable to take part in the challenge for Sting due to its physical requirements.  She chose Michael, the Strength power captain, to replace her for this challenge as she wanted Maddy and Janardan to undertake the 2nd round.

In the first round of the Island Challenge, both Shya and Michael were really close when collecting the first bag of balls. On the way back, Shya dropped a ball. When they both got to the scoring area, both scored two points. When collecting the next bag of balls, Shya went much quicker than Michael, who was going slower to prepare for the throwing of the next balls. Shya reached the scoring area and earned one point, then got the bonus two points for finishing first, putting Claw on 5 points. Michael then came to shoot. He had to score all the balls to win for Sting. He got all of the balls making the final score 6–5 to Sting.  Therefore, Michael won the advantage for the second round for Team Sting.

In the Totem Trial, Sting went first. The team was silent throughout the whole time and knocked off two statuettes. On Claw's turn, they were more vocal with each other and also knocked two statuettes over. The team made it through the course much quicker, but they took a while trying to put their block onto the end table. Overall, Sting finished the challenge in 6 minutes 54 seconds and Claw with 5 minutes 17 seconds. Therefore, Claw won another totem piece.

After Claw won, Shya's comments about Sting should be trying to make the Totem Trials "more of a challenge" caused some frustration to them. They didn't like how Claw showed off after winning and they were getting on Sting's nerves. Shya responded that she wasn't sick of winning, but she thought it was better if the challenges against each other were more closer, because knowing Claw were on a clear streak was just put in front of them and rather monotonous.

In the second round of the Island Challenge, both teams got to a fast start. Claw were ahead and first to start filling their water container. Sting then reached their hose and filled some of their container quicker than Claw. The other members of Sting watching shouted at them to throw a cog but Janardan waited for the right time. Sting went back to their bucket, then Claw started speeding ahead of them, but Claw went too quickly that they started losing some of their collected water. Janardan threw a cog at Claw and succeeded at making them spill more of their water. As they were emptying their water, Abbey from Claw threw the cog Janardan had just thrown back at them, but missed. Claw went out to collect some more water, so Sting left some of their water in the container to get some more quicker than Claw. As they were going back, Janardan threw another cog at Claw but missed. Claw had some trouble with their hose but finally tried to quickly refill their container, when Sting decided to fill their container with as much as they could. Both teams then went back to their bucket, Maddy and Harriet were both holding on to their container steadily so they wouldn't lose more water. Janardan threw his last cog at Claw but missed again. As Claw was carrying less water than Sting, they filled their bucket quicker and went back to get some more. Sting however, were trying to get every last drop from their container. Sting was about to get some more water but then the time ran out. Sting had a significantly larger amount of water than Claw, therefore winning the challenge and earning their next Sands of Time.

Day 6 (Episodes 11 and 12)
The Pendulum – In the first round, players must launch themselves with a rope swing to grab one of ten tiles hanging in front of a suspended wooden board. Each player is able to have 20 swings to try to get all of the ten tiles. Five of the tiles have a hidden map piece inside, and the player must try to get the most pieces of the map inside them. In the second round, one player has a hammer and must smash open the correct target drums with the rope swing. Another player has the map pieces from the first round showing where the targets are and is to call out where the swinger is supposed to hit. The team that smashes the most targets wins.
First round - Maddy from Sting vs Abbey from Claw - Bravery
Reward – To use the pieces of the map of the board collected for the second round.
Second round – Angus and Bronte from Sting vs Brandon and Rachel from Claw.
Totem Trial - Bug Banquet - Each team nominates a member to play each round and the designated member bids how much of a bug delicacy they will eat. Each team representative then eats the delicacy until they get to their bid amount and are the round winner. Each round has points that become cumulative, or the teams don't make it to their bids, the one that has eaten the most bugs scores points. They score 1 point for the first round, 3 points for the second and 5 points for the third. The team that scores the most points wins.

In the First Round of the Island Challenge, Maddy went first. As she got the hang of the swinging, she got two tiles straightaway. After getting a couple more, Sting called out to her to hang onto the board. Maddy made several attempts to hold on and failed, but finally she managed to hold on and pulled off some tiles using her feet. With only a few swings left, Maddy got another tile and had collected seven tiles in total. Maddy then smashed open the collected tiles and earned all five pieces of the map for the next round. On Abbey's turn, he got a tile successfully on his first swing. He slowly then got another two on his next few swings. Then, on his next few swings, Abbey would get really close to the tiles but couldn't get one. He then slowly made his swings better and got another few, and then he used Maddy's method of holding on to the board taking off another few tiles. With only four tiles left and a few swings left, Abbey got three of them and had a total of nine tiles. Abbey smashed his tiles open and had also collected all five pieces of the map for the next round, meaning Sting and Claw were both on an even advantage.

In the Totem Trial, the first dish was revealed: curried crickets. Power Captain Abbey chose Harriet for Claw and Maddy chose Angus to take part for Sting. Both teams bidded to eat the maximum of five crickets, and Harriet and Angus quickly ate five crickets successfully, making them both win a point for their teams. The next dish was giant ants to be eaten by Michael for Sting and Shya for Claw. They both bidded to eat the maximum of ten crickets. Both of them didn't like eating them, but Shya felt worse. She almost decided to stop but with the help and encouragement of her team, Claw, she kept going. Michael then managed to eat the maximum of ten ants, and Shya tried to eat more but could only managed six, so Sting were leading by 4–1. The last dish were scorpions which had to be eaten by the Power Captains, Abbey and Maddy. Both of them bidded to eat one scorpion but reluctantly gave their final bid of the maximum of four. As they were eating, Abbey and Maddy found the scorpions taste bitter and had a bad stench. At last, Abbey finished all his scorpions and Maddy soon followed, meaning they both got five points each and brought the score to 9–6 to Sting, so they got their second Totem Power Piece.

In the second round of the Island Challenge, Sting went first with Angus swinging. He managed to hit a target on the first few swings, with Bronte clearly calling the directions, but throughout the next ten swings he kept missing, and he even hit one of the drums that wasn't a target. Soon he improved and managed to smash another. After hitting another one that wasn't a target, with only a few swings left he got four more targets and Sting's final score was six. On Claw's turn, Brandon was swinging. He struggled for the whole time and ended up randomly hitting some drums in a row that were not targets. Brandon soon found his form and smashed a few targets, but was still struggling and smashed more drums that weren't targets. Claw's final score was four, so Sting won the Island Challenge and their fifth Sands of Time extending their lead to 5–1.

At the camps, Sting were speculating that the island was going to surprise them by swapping some team members. This eventually got them worried. The news spread to Claw's camp, and they were worried about it as well, because they really liked their team.

At the Island Fire, since all the Power Captains had versed each other in the Island Challenges, the island revealed a shocking twist that one power captain from Sting and Claw had to swap teams. The island chose Speed to swap, so Shya was moved to Sting, and Bronte was moved to Claw. Both teams were devastated about this change. Shya felt shocked and nervous about being on Sting, and Bronte was affected since she had worked hard to help Sting gain a lead and was now transferred to the team that were behind, thus she felt that she belonged in Sting.

Day 7 (Episodes 13 and 14)
Leap of Faith: - In the first round, one adventurer from each team has to climb up one ladder to untie 9 dice. The other adventurer has to swing across from the inner ladder and catch the dice to throw them into a target. The team that does this the quickest wins. In the second round, the player has to swing from one ladder to another, collecting a disc one at a time in number order, lowering a boulder closer to the ground. Once all discs have been removed the player must pick up the boulder and place it on the plinth. The team that does this first, wins.
First Round - Maddy and Janardan from Sting vs Brandon and Harriet from Claw
Reward - To remove one disc for a player to collect in the next round, therefore their boulder will be lowered.
Second Round - Shya from Sting vs Bronte from Claw - Speed
Totem Trial - Pop - Using a blowpipe, the teams have to shoot darts to pop balloons suspending a gold scorpion statue until enough have been popped to make the statue touch the ground. The team that does this the fastest wins.

From here on, the island decided that teams play in the first round of the Island Challenge, winning the advantage for the power captains going head to head in the second round.

In the first round of the Island Challenge, for Sting, Janardan was untieing the dice while Maddy collected them, and for Claw, Harriet untied the dice while Brandon collected them. Team Claw were quicker and finished first with more dice on target, they therefore won the first round 8 dice to 5.  In winning they earned their captain Bronte an advantage for the second round.

In the Totem Trial, Claw went first and Abbey undertook the challenge alone. Abbey was successful at his first shots but started to get a little tired and off his aim, but he finally made the statue touch the ground. On Sting's turn, Michael went first and successfully popped several balloons in a row. Angus then took over but his aim was poor so he was quickly switched for Shya. Shya did better that Angus but couldn't get some balloons, so she was switched back for Michael. Michael still managed to pop the balloons until the statue touched the ground. Overall, Claw finished the task in 2 minutes 5 seconds, but Sting finished in 4 minutes 26 seconds, so Claw won another Totem piece.  After this challenge Shya said that she was now 'Sting forever'.

When the teams went back to camp, both Shya and Bronte were happily adjusted to their teams and liked being with them, and the rest of the team members agreed. At their camp, Claw found some balloons and decided to write a message on it and to make a group wish to escape from Scorpion Island first. If the balloon passed the trees then their wish would be more likely to happen, showing that it "escaped". The balloon did do this.

Before the second round started, the boys of Sting were bragging over how many Sands of Time they had one, and the boys from Claw were calling names back at them. They both continued to bicker at each other but the girls stopped them and told them to ignore each other and be quiet.

In the second round of the Island Challenge, both girls were quick getting up their ladders, but Bronte from Claw had a confident swing and got her disc first. Shya from Sting then got her first disc but didn't dispose of it, and as she couldn't hold on to the starting ladder, she kept swinging back and forth. Bronte continued getting good swings and made easy work removing the numbers discs. Once Shya did dispose her disc, she did her best to catch up and even though she used the same methods as Bronte, because of that problem she couldn't overtake her. Although Bronte missed a disc on one swing, she kept continuing getting the remaining discs and made the boulder touch the ground. Bronte placed the boulder on the plinth and won the challenge for Claw, and their second Sands of Time.

Day 8 (Episodes 15 and 16)
Splashdown - In the first round, one team must run across pontoons carrying scorpion dice one at a time while the other swings boulders at them trying to push them off during the 10-minute time limit.  For each dice taken across a point is earned, but if one falls off, the team is deducted 3 points from their total. Once the time is up, the teams must swap roles. The team that earns the most points wins. In the second round, one person is running across the pontoons with the dice and their opposition is swinging the boulders at them during the 10-minute time limit. For every die the carrier gets across the pontoons, they score one point for their team, but if the person throwing the boulders knocks the carrier off, they get three points for their team. The team with the most points wins.
First Round - Maddy, Michael, Shya and Angus from Sting vs Harriet, Abbey, Rachael and Bronte from Claw
Reward - To choose whether to throw the boulders or run across the pontoon in the second round.
Second Round - Janardan from Sting vs Brandon from Claw - Balance
Totem Trial - Heavy Weight - The team captains, blindfolded, had to use a long pole to transport five bottles onto a set of scales to balance it in the fastest time, using the help of their team. The team that finishes this the quickest wins.

In the first round of the Island Challenge, Claw went first. On Bronte and Harriet's turns, she easily managed to get across. Sting also managed to knock a die from Abbey's hands and they made Rachael fall off twice, losing 6 points from their score. As Claw put more dice on, Abbey knocked off a die by mistake from their collected dice. Later, another die was knocked off by Bronte. Harriet passed it to Bronte, but unaware of this, she took it back to the start. Once the time was up, Claw achieved to transport 11 dice, but with the two falls, their total was reduced to 5. On Sting's turn, the members were getting across the pontoons easily, but Claw were having troubles with their boulders and did not achieve a hit. Harriet even got tangled up in the boulders and fell off her own platform as Shya was crossing. In the last few seconds, Michael was having trouble untying a die from the start, while another die from the end floated away. When the time was up, Sting had achieved 13 dice, winning the challenge and the advantage for Janardan in the second round. When choosing which role to play as in the second round, Janardan said that 'throwing boulders at Brandon was tempting', but decided to choose with running across the pontoons.

After the challenge, Abbey, Claw's most competitive team member thought that Janardan, during the first round was being big-headed and that Sting were winning by luck. Janardan said that they were the most competitive from their teams and that there was no real rivalry, they just like their own teams.

In the Totem Trial, Sting went first. Janardan put his first four bottles on without any trouble, but as he kept going, due to a lack of cooperation, the rest of Sting were all calling out things and this frustrated Janardan. While handling his last bottle, it ended up going down the pole from the hook, and the speakers from Sting were arguing within each other. Sting decided to take it off and get another bottle, and finally managed to get it in. After the challenge, Sting's speakers argued about their performance. In Claw's turn, Brandon carefully managed to put the bottles on the scales, and whenever the rest of Claw were all speaking at once, Brandon shouted and told them to speak one at a time. At one point, Brandon knocked over four of five remaining bottles in his basket, but with the help of his teammates, he picked them up and got all of the bottles in the basket. Afterwards, Johnny said that the winners of the Totem Trial was to be revealed at the Island Fire. When they went back to their camps, Sting and Claw pondered over why the island was holding the result of the trial.

In the second round of the Island Challenge, Janardan for Sting started off putting his body flat on the pontoons while he was untieing a die, and went across easily while Brandon for Claw was struggling with the boulders and could not hit Janardan. As the game progressed, this kept happening but at one point, Brandon did touch Janardan with a boulder but it wasn't strong enough to push him off the pontoons. Janardan would often stop at some points waiting for a boulder to swing back before continuing. As Janardan was successfully building a strong lead, as he was trying to reach for a boulder, Brandon even fell into the water, making it much easier for Janardan. Janardan was even showboating by at first, walking backwards, then again by simply walking off the end of the pontoons into the water. The rest of Sting was also celebrating early as they knew they couldn't lose, while Claw were trying to give advice with the boulders to Brandon, but he simply could not knock Brandon over. When the time ran out, Janardan had won 8–0 and won a Sands of Time for Sting, extending their lead 6 - 2.

At the Island Fire, the results of the Totem Trial had been revealed and Claw won, winning their fifth Totem Power Piece to Sting's two.

Day 9 (Episodes 17 and 18)
Perilous Puzzle – In the first round, one team member must pass large puzzle pieces to the other on a ladder and fit them onto a grid. The team that completes the puzzle first wins. In the second round, a team member must construct the inner part of the puzzle. The team that completes it first wins.
First Round - Janardan and Angus from Sting vs Brandon and Rachael from Claw
Reward - To start the second round with one puzzle piece already put in place.
Second Round - Michael from Sting vs Harriet from Claw - Strength
Totem Trial - Suspension - Two people from each team must hold up a balloon filled with Scorpion Island dust with weights on top. The first team that makes their balloon touch the spikes on the ground scores a point for the other team. The team with the most points after three rounds wins.

In the first round of the Island Challenge, both teams started off fitting the puzzle pieces together on the ground to have a plan on where to put them on the grid. When Claw were having little difficulties with one part of the puzzle, Sting's Angus was already putting theirs in place. A moment later, Rachael from Claw also started fitting their puzzle in place. Rachael chose to do the largest piece that was difficult to hold on a ladder early so that she could not be tired later on with it. Soon, Claw had already got more of their puzzle in than Sting's. At some points, while they were getting tired, Angus and Rachael often dropped pieces. As the puzzles were almost complete, Angus started to have problems with the largest piece, and ended up dropping it four times. While Claw were having a little adjustment with the last few pieces yet, Sting tried to catch up, but Claw then managed to complete the puzzle first and win the advantage for the second round. As the teams were constructing the puzzle, the onlookers of Sting and Claw pondered over what the puzzle was depicting, and most people thought the puzzle picture was of their powers.

In the Totem Trial, Michael and Maddy from Sting took on Harriet and Bronte from Claw in lifting the 15 kg weight. As time elapsed, both teams were still holding the balloon steadily and did not look tired at all. After 10 minutes, the Island decided to end the challenge and both teams scored one point each. In the second round, the weight was now 20 kg and Michael and Janardan from Sting took on Harriet and Abbey from Claw. Both teams got rather tired as they held on, but Sting's slipped and dropped their balloon making the score 2–1 to Claw. In the last round Michael and Angus from Sting took on Harriet and Brandon from Claw. Both teams were exhausted but kept holding. Claw were continually slipping and were close to making their balloon pop, but with some encouragement from Rachael, they managed to raise the balloon higher. Then, Sting began to lower their balloon, and were trying their best to hold on as their balloon was just resting on the spikes, but all of a sudden popped, making the score 3–1 to Claw, so they won another totem piece.

Before the second round, both teams were doing their own chants at each other, and shouted out to each other they were copying each other since Bronte and Shya had both been on both teams at one stage and had taken chants to the other team.

In the second round of the Island Challenge, both Harriet and Michael started off with positioning the puzzle pieces on the ground. As Harriet had the advantage of one puzzle piece put in already, Michael copied her by putting that same puzzle piece in his grid in. As Harriet started to construct the bottom of her puzzle, Michael made small looks at what she was doing and copied her. Harriet had already constructed the bottom of her puzzle, and Michael had too, but both were different. Both them knocked a puzzle piece off and Harriet fixed her mistake and got some of her puzzle correctly in place, but Michael had constructed the bottom upside down, therefore, every other connected piece was positioned upside down. Later, Harriet only had a few puzzle pieces to put in, and the rest of Claw laughed at noticing Michael's mistake. Sting then realised what Michael had done, and called out to him that the puzzle was upside down, but it was too late as Harriet got her last pieces in place and won the challenge, gaining a Sands of Time for Claw. After the challenge, Michael noticed his puzzle was upside down and laughed. The other team members thought that the finished puzzle had something to do with the Totem Power Pieces.

At the Island Fire, the Island revealed that the puzzle constructed in Perilous Puzzle was depicting the Totem Power Pieces as steps, because on the final day, the teams were going to be climbing up a huge cliff-face. The more Power Pieces a team had, the higher they would start up the cliff.

Day 10 (Episodes 19 and 20)
The Bone Collector - In the first round, a team member is suspended on a swing in the air while two others are pulling them into place. The suspended adventurer must use a grabber to pick up bones set inside a large stone and throw them into a bucket. Each bone placed in the bucket scores a point, but if one is dropped, then it is out of play. The team that collects the most bones in 10 minutes wins. In the second round, a member is attached to a bungee and must climb on ropes upside-down towards the stone, picking up bones and putting them in the holes. If a bone if dropped, it is out of play. The team that has the most bones in the holes after 10 minutes wins.
First Round - Maddy, Michael and Janardan from Sting vs Harriet, Bronte and Abbey from Claw
Reward - To start the second round with a bone already in place.
Second Round - Angus from Sting vs Rachael from Claw - Stamina
Totem Trial - Downpour - The captains must use a stick to hold a trapdoor at the bottom of a bucket on top of them, while the opposing team members tried to fill up the buckets with water. If one player makes the trapdoor open up, the game is over and the team that kept holding it shut wins.

In the first round of the Island Challenge, Sting went first. Janardan missed getting his first bone in the barrel, but achieved on his second and third. While calling out clear instructions as he was handling his fourth bone, he dropped it, however he earned another point on his fifth. As he was going, Janardan used the grabber as a support to prevent himself spinning around. Later, he dropped several bones, one bone even bounced out of the barrel. Janardan then handled one of his last bones, but didn't have enough time, so Sting scored 4 points. On Claw's turn, Abbey was on the swing. He made quick work scoring his first two bones, but after dropping one, he continued to get bones in. Abbey used a trick by putting a bone in one of the empty holes if he was about to drop it. With only a few bones left, Abbey decided to pick them up and place them in the holes closest to the barrel. Much to the frustration of Harriet, saying that he was wasting time, Abbey got all the bones he placed in the holes into the barrel quickly. Handling his last bone, Abbey managed to get it into the barrel before the time ran out, so Claw scored nine points to Sting's four, so Claw won the advantage for Rachael in the second round.
 
In the Totem Trial, both Stamina captains Angus and Rachael were to hold up their trapdoors. Sting had Maddy tipping the water in Claw's bucket, and Abbey was filling Sting's. Both Angus and Rachael were being drenched as their buckets were being filled and showed their strain. Claw decided to change plans making Bronte pass the water to Abbey, while Sting's Shya continued passing the water to Maddy. With one last bucket from Abbey, Angus' bucket made him move his stick a little which caused the trapdoor to open, so Claw won another Totem Power Piece.

After the Totem Trial, Sting, at their camp, were discussing about their disadvantage of having not as much Power Pieces as Claw for the last day. They didn't understand how they often lost the Totem Trials even when they are trying their hardest, and Janardan and Michael practised climbing on their pieces to strategise. Then, all of Sting started to have a workout session.

In the second round of the Island Challenge, Sting went first. At first, Angus was having trouble adjusting to the ropes and did not place his first two bones in the holes fully, but soon he found his form and placed three bones in successfully as well as his first two halfway through. Angus then carefully succeeded putting more bones in before the time ran out and achieved eight bones in total. On Claw's turn, Rachael, who had one bone already put in as an advantage from the first round, quickly got her first few bones in, but then later dropped one. Rachael had some problems with the ropes as she often accidentally let go, but continued scoring more bones. With only a few seconds left, Rachael dropped another bone that was to equal Angus' score, so Claw had seven bones in total. The winner was Sting by one point, who achieved another Sands of Time.

After the Island Challenge, Angus from Sting reflected that during the challenge, as he was going upside-down, something changed inside him which made him go acrobatic on the ropes and getting used to being upside-down. He and the rest of Sting declared that he was to be the new superhero, "Scorpion Man".

Day 11 (Episodes 21 and 22)
Scales of Justice - One team, with two players changing along the path and one player dealing coconuts, must transport them using bamboo piping across on wood plinths to a set of scales. If a coconut is dropped, or a player falls off the wood, that coconut is out of play and a new one is used. The other team has 12 foam darts that they can throw at them passing. If a dart hits someone on the body, a 15-second time penalty is added to their score. When the team tips the scales to the other side using some of the 25 coconuts provided, the time is stopped, and both teams switch roles. The team that completes the challenge in the fastest time wins.
Island Challenge - Maddy, Shya and Michael from Sting vs Abbey, Brandon and Bronte from Claw - Bravery
Totem Trial - Line of Fire - The Bravery power captains take part in this challenge. One captain must choose one of three plinth seats to sit on underneath holes in a wall. The other captain must guess under which hole that person is sitting on and tip a bucket of water down it. If the captain gets hit by the water, a point out of five is scored. After all five turns are up, the teams then switch roles. The team which hits the other team the most number of times wins.

On the penultimate day, the island brought a large rainfall down to shake the adventurers.

In the Totem Trial, Maddy from Sting went first in the challenge and got a direct hit of water from Abbey. She then chose the same place to sit to outwit Abbey, but got hit again. Maddy then changed her position to the other end of the wall, but Abbey missed and got the hole next to it. Maddy went back to the place she started, but Abbey missed again with the same hole he used before. On the last turn, Maddy chose the middle of the wall, and got another hit, so Claw got 3 out of 5 hits. On Abbey's turn, he got a hit from Sting on his first go. On the next go, Abbey went to the other side of the wall and got another hit from Sting. On the third go, Abbey went back to the place he started and got a hit again from Sting that equaled the score. On the fourth go, Abbey stayed in his position but knocked on the wall to trick Sting. Sting missed Abbey with the hole next to him. Abbey then went to the middle, and teammate Rachael even bluffed Sting with deliberate footsteps. Sting missed Abbey again so it was 3 all to the teams. The island decided to spin the "Dial of Destiny", which landed on Sting who won the last Totem Power piece.

After the Totem Trial, Claw were not rattled about losing their first Totem Trial in a while, and shared their thoughts on why they deserved to escape the island.

In the Island Challenge, Sting went first with Shya and Michael passing the coconuts. On the first coconut, Claw fired three arrows, but all of them missed and Sting easily delivered their first coconut to the scales. On the next few coconuts, Claw's Brandon got a few hits, but Sting were not shaken as they calmly continued. On the fifth coconut, Sting dropped it after an arrow from Claw disrupted them. Claw were soon out of arrows, and Sting quickly hurried as they quietly got more coconuts into the scales. With only a few coconuts need to balance the scales, Michael fell off the wood as he got a coconut from Shya. Then Michael had almost caused a coconut to be null and void as he almost touched the ground when putting the coconut in the scales. Sting then started to feel pressure as Shya and Michael were hurrying too fast and dropped a few more coconuts, but finally tipped the scales. Claw had given three 15-second penalties to Sting, bringing their final time to 6:35. On Claw's turn, Power Captain Abbey along with Brandon were passing the coconuts and Bronte was handing them at the start. On their first coconut, Maddy shot an arrow straight at them, giving them a time penalty. Abbey and Brandon were rather shaky as they passed the coconuts across, but concentrated carefully. Michael from Sting tried to put Claw off by once again, distracting them saying there were bugs on them. Soon, a short distraction from Brandon caused him to drop a coconut, and on the next one he fell off a wood plinth. Then, Abbey stumbled off his plinth and then dropped yet another coconut. Sting used their last two arrows and missed on both times. On their eighth coconut, Brandon was very close to dropping his bamboo shoot but quickly recovered and got it into the scales. As they were so close to tipping the scales, Abbey started to panic, and he and Brandon were rushing so much that Abbey dropped another coconut. On their last coconut needed, Claw rushed quickly and successfully tipped the scales in 6:38, which included one 15 second time penalty from Sting. So, Sting won the Island Challenge by three seconds and won the last Sands of Time.

At the Island Fire, Sting had 8 Sands of Time bags, and Claw had 3 bags, but Claw had 7 Power Pieces to Sting's 3, so Claw had the highest head start up the cliff face in the final challenge. As Sting had more Sands of Time bags, each adventurer from Sting emptied a bag into the power glass, representing their head start in the final challenge.

Day 12 (Episodes 23, 24, 25 and 26)
The Escape - In the Strength stage, the teams must haul a rope to lift up a gate, releasing a log. They then must unknot the ropes on the log and roll it across the finish line. The first team to do this wins a time advantage for the next stage from the time it takes for the other team to finish after. In the Balance stage, one person must roll the log while the four other members one at a time must walk across a narrow pole with them. Once this is done, they must move to the Stamina stage where the teams have to roll the log across a muddy obstacle course. When the log has completed the course, the teams must break through the wall at the finish line. The first team to do this wins a 30-second time advantage for the final stage. In the final stages, one member from each team must race up their Totem Pieces in the Speed stage and then begin their climb up Freedom Rock in the Bravery stage. During their climb, the team members must untie a certain part of a rope scorpion lying on the rocks. The outer pincers must be undone in the first race, the inner pincers in the second, the body in the third race, the legs in the fourth and the tail in the fifth. The first person up the rock in each race earns a time advantage for their team in the next stage, and the first person to reach the finish line on the rock in the last race wins.
Challenge - Angus, Janardan, Shya, Maddy and Michael from Sting vs Harriet, Rachael, Brandon, Bronte and Abbey from Claw.
Reward - Escape from Scorpion Island

In the Strength stage of the Island Challenge, Sting had a 50-second time advantage from the Sands of Time bags they won. When they started, Sting quickly released their log, but took too much time with unknotting it. Just as Sting finished knotting their log, it was time for Claw to start. They released their log and were also having trouble with the knots. Claw moved the log closer to the gate to make it easier to unknot, while Sting went to the finish line. Claw soon finished unknotting, but as they were rolling the log, they almost went off the course, but quickly realigned and got to the finish line. Sting got a 49-second time advantage from the amount of time Claw took after they finished.

In the Balance stage, everyone got across the balance beam without any problems except a slip from Brandon. In the Stamina stage, Sting's Maddy and Shya pushed obstacles into Claw's way, and some of Claw went ahead to clear their way. That left Abbey and Bronte were pushing the log alone by themselves and slowed them down. Sting then pushed the barrel over the hill with them, smashing through the wall winning the 30 seconds head start on Freedom Rock.

In the first race of the Speed and Bravery stage, Angus from Sting went against Abbey from Claw. Angus started first with his head start and struggled to climb up his totem pieces before getting onto the ladder, which by then Abbey started. He went much quicker and was soon level with Angus. Abbey then took a big leap out to untie the first outer piece of the scorpion, and Angus soon followed. Both Angus and Abbey slipped at points on the wet rock but Abbey, who wasn't slipping as much, climbed his way up the rock the fastest and earned the 30 second time advantage for the second race.

The second race was Shya from Sting vs Brandon from Claw. Brandon got up his totem pieces as fast as he could and one inner piece of the scorpion untied during his time advantage before Shya started. Shya was soon at the same point as Brandon after he slipped on the ladder. Both adventurers got the second inner scorpion piece undone and both made their way up the rest of the rock. It was a close race, but Shya gained enough speed to beat Brandon by only a small margin and reached the finish line at the top, earning a 30-second time advantage for the second race.

The third race was Maddy from Sting vs Harriet from Claw. During Maddy's time advantage, she had already gotten herself quite far from the starting line, before Harriet started. Harriet made light work of the totem pieces and swung quite a bit. Maddy easily untied her bottom body rope and quickly made her way to the top, while Harriet had just undone hers. At first, Maddy untied the wrong rope but fixed her error after the short pause. Harriet caught up with Maddy and untied her top body rope. Then, Maddy was having trouble just as she was getting towards the top, allowing Harriet to overtake her by a small margin and winning a 30-second time advantage for the fourth race.

The fourth race was Janardan from Sting vs Rachael from Claw. Rachael quickly started on the ladder during her time advantage before Janardan started. Janardan however struggled on climbing up his totem pieces. Rachael untied three rope legs before Janardan started untying his first leg. Janardan was having too many slips as he reached out on the rock, while Rachael achieved all legs untied and started to go towards the top. Janardan fixed a plan at the top of his ropes where he could haul all the ropes through, but frustratingly had to go down and loosen the bottom rope when it didn't work, just as Rachael achieved a win for Claw, and a 30-second time advantage for the final race.

The final race was Michael from Sting vs Bronte from Claw. Bronte made use of her head start as she was well up the cliff face before it was time for Michael to start. Michael raced up the ladder and tried to close their gap. Bronte then made it up to the tail rope, and tried to untie it without a glove on, but once she untied it, she dropped her glove. Michael soon got level with Bronte, but as he was about to untie his tail, he made a big slip. Bronte went to untie the bit of the tail while taking her other glove off, but dropped that as well. Just as Bronte was making her last climb towards the finish, Michael tried to untie his last bit of the tail. There was no stopping Bronte however as she got her way past the line and won it for Claw. Claw had escaped from Scorpion Island. Michael didn't give up however and edged his way up to the finish line for Sting. The rest of Claw were so happy for Bronte but showed sportsmanship for Sting as well. A helicopter arrived on the island to pick up Claw and take them home. Both teams also reflected on their time on the island and how it changed them. The spirits of the powers in the Arena of the Powers had then become released, and the members of Sting were set in stone to replace them. Claw on the other hand celebrated their win and stopped off at a public beach to have fun.

Best of Scorpion Island (Episodes 27 and 28)

Facts

 Season 4 and Season 5 were recorded at the same time.
 Brontë, Rachel, Janardan and Michael were the favourites by the judges.
 Harriet is the only Australian adventurer to not be a member of Sting at any point. 
 Harriet is the only Australian adventurer to have escaped. 
 Maddy is the only female adventurer to never be a member of Claw at any point.
 Angus and Maddy are the only members of Sting to have won a Totem Piece. 
 Brandon, Bronte and Harriet are the only members of Claw to have won a Sands of Time though Brandon won it in a tie with Janardan of Sting in Edge of Doom while Bronte won her first as a member of Sting in Tracks of Terror. 
 Abbey is the only member of Claw to have not won a Totem Piece. He is also the only adventurer overall to have neither won this or a Sands of Time.  
 Maddy is the only member of Sting to have won a Totem Piece twice. 
 It is presumed that the reason why the Speed Representatives (Bronte and Shya) were chosen to switch teams on Day 6 was because Bronte chose to sit out of the first round of Tracks of Terror due to injury while Shya upon winning another Totem Challenge for Claw became tired of constantly winning them and hoped that Sting would someday catch up.  
 Compared to the past two series, members of Sting wore black helmets while members of Claw wore orange helmets rather than vice versa which would also apply to the next series. However, they aren't the official colours as Sting's is red and Claw's is yellow as part of the revamp.

References
 http://www.rdfmedia.com/newsitem.aspx?id=74

External links
 https://www.bbc.co.uk/cbbc/scorpionisland/
 http://www.abc.net.au/abc3/scorpionisland/

2010 British television seasons